New York Thrash is a hardcore punk compilation album released by ROIR in 1982.

Considered a definitive document of the early New York hardcore and late 1970s punk scene, New York Thrash features rare and otherwise unreleased recordings, including the first recorded material by the Beastie Boys (also on their Polly Wog Stew EP) as well as material by Bad Brains. Original artwork and cover lettering by Bob Giordano

The album was originally released in cassette format with liner notes by Tim Sommer, but was reissued on CD with two bonus tracks in 1998.

Track listing
 "I Hate Music" – The Mad
 "Getaway" – Kraut
 "Shotgun" – Heart Attack
 "Social Reason" – The Undead
 "New Year's Eve" – Adrenalin O.D.
 "Illusion Won Again – Even Worse
 "Cry Now" – Fiends
 "Here and Now" – Nihilistics
 "Nightmare – The Undead
 "Taxidermist" – False Prophets
 "Regulator (Version)" – Bad Brains
 "Riot Fight" – Beastie Boys
 "Love and Kisses" – Nihilistics
 "Asian White" – Fiends
 "Last Chance" – Kraut
 "Emptying the Madhouse" – Even Worse
 "Paul's Not Home" – Adrenalin O.D.
 "Scorched Earth" – False Prophets
 "God Is Dead" – Heart Attack
 "The Hell" – The Mad
 "Big Take Over (Version)" – Bad Brains
 "Beastie" – Beastie Boys
 "M.A.C.H.I.N.E." – The Stimulators*
 "Loud Fast Rules!" – The Stimulators*

* snide bonus tracks included on 1998 CD reissue

See also
List of punk compilation albums

References

External links
 New York Thrash page on ROIR

1982 compilation albums
Hardcore punk compilation albums
ROIR compilation albums
Regional music compilation albums
Music of New York City